Topsy Tjulyata is an Aboriginal artist from central Australia. She makes these by carving the wood and then engraving patterns into its surface with a burning wire. This technique is called pokerwork. The wood she uses is sourced locally from the area around Uluṟu, where she lives. She makes both decorative sculptures and traditional tools. The patterns engraved into the objects depict , spiritual stories about creation ancestors from the Dreamtime.

Early life and education 
Topsy began working in arts and crafts at Ernabella in the late 1940s. She specialised in wood carving. While she was living there, she married Walter Pukutiwara, a shepherd who also crafted tools. They later moved to Amaṯa.

Artwork and career 
In 1981, Topsy and Walter went to Uluṟu and set up a tent at the base of Uluṟu. From there they sold their  works to tourists for over two weeks. They did this trip with other artists from Amaṯa, including Pulya Taylor and Tony Tjamiwa, and their friends Peter Yates and Pat D'Arango. In 1983, this group travelled around to artist communities in the Aṉangu Pitjantjatjara Yankunytjatjara Lands. This was to discuss the idea of setting up a new craft centre at Uluṟu that would sell artworks from around the region to tourists. The couple moved to Muṯitjulu so that they could help set up Maṟuku Arts. Topsy and Water were some of the first artists for the centre, and worked together closely until Walter's death in 2004. Topsy is still a member of the organisation's Governing Committee.

Notable collections 
A collection of wooden bowls made by Topsy are held in the National Gallery of Australia. The patterns engraved on the surfaces depict stories about the Seven Sisters. Both the Powerhouse Museum and the National Museum of Australia contain examples of Topsy's sculptures.

References

This article includes text from the Powerhouse Museum, Australia, which has been licensed under CC-BY-SA.

External links
 Topsy Tjulyata Taylor at Prints and Printmaking

1931 births
Living people
20th-century Australian sculptors
Australian woodworkers
Indigenous Australian artists
Pitjantjatjara people
20th-century Australian women artists
Women woodworkers